Micropygus is a genus of flies in the family Dolichopodidae, found in New Zealand. The genus was originally named by Octave Parent in 1933. However, as the genus was not designated a type species, this name was unavailable until 1989, when Daniel J. Bickel and C. E. Dyte designated Micropygus bifenestratus as the type species.

Species
 Micropygus bifenestratus Parent, 1933
 Micropygus bipunctatus Parent, 1933
 Micropygus brevicornis Parent, 1933
 Micropygus brevithorax Parent, 1933
 Micropygus divergens Parent, 1933
 Micropygus inornatus Parent, 1933
 Micropygus lacustris Parent, 1933
 Micropygus nigripes Parent, 1933
 Micropygus puerulus Parent, 1933
 Micropygus pulchellus Parent, 1933
 Micropygus ripicola Parent, 1933
 Micropygus serratus Parent, 1933
 Micropygus striatus Parent, 1933
 Micropygus tarsatus Parent, 1933
 Micropygus transiens Parent, 1933
 Micropygus vagans Parent, 1933

References

Sympycninae
Dolichopodidae genera
Diptera of New Zealand
Endemic insects of New Zealand